Riverbank is an unincorporated rural community in Mapleton Township, Wellington County, Ontario, Canada.  Prior to 1999, Riverbank was located in Maryborough Township.

The Conestogo River flows through Riverbank.

History
A post office was located in Riverbank from 1877 to 1915.

The Riverbank Cheese and Butter Company was located at the settlement from 1882 to 1893.

By 1910, Riverbank had a general store, and a daily stage to Drayton.  The population was about 50.

References

Communities in Wellington County, Ontario